Arzu Aliyeva (born 23 January 1989) is the younger daughter of the President of Azerbaijan, Ilham Aliyev.

Early life
Arzu Aliyeva was born on January 23, 1989, in Baku, then Azerbaijan SSR, USSR. She attended high school number 160 in Baku and was also educated in Switzerland and Great Britain, together with her older sister Leyla.

Career 

She is a member of the ruling Aliyev family in Azerbaijan. She was embroiled in scandals involving the family's wealth, as she and her family members had wealth stashed in elaborate networks of offshore companies. The documents showed that Arzu and her sister Leyla controlled two previously hidden British Virgin Islands-incorporated firms — Kingsview Developments Limited and Exaltation Limited. Documents have also shown her to be the owner of the offshore company Arbor Investments.

According to a 2010 RFE/RL report, she owns Silk Way Bank. A 2012 report from the Organized Crime and Corruption Reporting Project found that she owned a house worth $1 million in the Czech luxury resort Karlovy Vary.

In 2008, Arzu Aliyeva participated in the shooting of a promotional video clip about Azerbaijan. This video clip was shown on CNN and Euronews. She produced the documentaries "Objective: Baku. Hitler’s War On Oil” (2015) and "Son Iclas" (2018). She directed Eternal Mission” (Original: “Abadi ezamiyyat”, 2016). Aliyeva is a co-owner of Silk Way Bank, a "pocket" bank of the holding company SW Holding, owned by numerous services of the state airline AZAL during privatization. She works for the Heydar Aliyev Foundation, named after her grandfather and run by her mother Mehriban Aliyeva.

In November 2021, Arzu Aliyeva was awarded the prize for "Contribution to the Culture of the Turkic World" at the Korkut Ata Film Festival in Istanbul.

Personal life
She has been married to Samed Gurbanov since September 3, 2011. Samed Gurbanov (born 1988) is the only son of the Azerbaijani-Russian businessperson Aydin Kurbanov. Samed Gurbanov was born and raised in Moscow, and is currently involved in family business. Gurbanov has two children: Aydin (born 2012) and Aziza (born 2016).

References

External links

External links

1989 births
Living people
Azerbaijani film producers
Azerbaijani television producers
Film people from Baku
Daughters of national leaders
People named in the Panama Papers
Aliyev family